Walter John Whiteley is a professor in the department of mathematics and statistics at York University in Canada. He specializes in geometry and mathematics education, and is known for his expertise in structural rigidity and rigidity matroids.

Education and career
Whiteley graduated from Queen's University in 1966.
He earned his Ph.D. in 1971 from the Massachusetts Institute of Technology, with a dissertation titled Logic and Invariant Theory supervised by Gian-Carlo Rota.
He worked as an instructor at Champlain College Saint-Lambert, with a joint appointment in mathematics and humanities, from 1972 until he joined the York University faculty in 1992.

Awards and honours
In 2009, Whiteley won the Adrien Pouliot Award of the Canadian Mathematical Society for his contributions to mathematics education.
In August 2014, the Fields Institute at the University of Toronto hosted a workshop on rigidity theory and spatial reasoning, "inspired by the distinguished career of Professor Walter Whiteley".

Selected publications
.
.
.
.
.
.

References

External links
Home page

Year of birth missing (living people)
Living people
Canadian mathematicians
Geometers
Queen's University at Kingston alumni
Massachusetts Institute of Technology School of Science alumni
Academic staff of York University